Alexander Vidal Larín Hernández (born 27 June 1992) is a Salvadoran professional footballer who plays as a left-back for Primera División club Alianza and the El Salvador national team.

Career

Early career in El Salvador
Larín began his career in the reserve side of Turín FESA before joining Second Division El Roble de Ilobasco.

Larín went on to play in the First Division with Atlético Marte for a season.

In 2011, he joined to FAS for 3 years, where he scored 20 goals in 69 appearances. During his time with FAS, the team were runners-up twice in the Primera División; in the 2012/2013 Clausura and the 2013/2014 Apertura.

Herediano
On 16 June 2014, Larín signed a three-year deal with Liga MX club Tigres UANL for an undisclosed fee, and immediately went to loan with Costa Rican club Herediano for six months. He made his debut for Herediano in the 2014–15 CONCACAF Champions League group stage on 21 August 2014 against Isidro Metapán, where he assisted Víctor Núñez's goal to achieve a 4-0 victory.

Tigres UANL
On 2 June 2015, Larín returned to Tigres after his loan with Herediano ended.

International career

International goals
Scores and results list El Salvador's goal tally first.

Honours
 Club Sport Herediano
Primera División de Costa Rica (1): 2015 Verano
 FC Juárez
Ascenso MX (1): Apertura 2015
 Alianza F.C.
TBD (2): Apertura 2017, Clausura 2018
 Comunicaciones
 CONCACAF League (1): 2021
Liga Nacional de Guatemala (1): Clausura 2022

References

External links
 
 

1992 births
Living people
Salvadoran footballers
Salvadoran expatriate footballers
El Salvador international footballers
Sportspeople from San Salvador
C.D. Atlético Marte footballers
C.D. FAS footballers
Tigres UANL footballers
C.S. Herediano footballers
FC Juárez footballers
Alianza F.C. footballers
Comunicaciones F.C. players
Primera División de Fútbol Profesional players
Ascenso MX players
Liga FPD players
Liga Nacional de Fútbol de Guatemala players
2013 Copa Centroamericana players
2013 CONCACAF Gold Cup players
2014 Copa Centroamericana players
2015 CONCACAF Gold Cup players
2017 Copa Centroamericana players
2017 CONCACAF Gold Cup players
Expatriate footballers in Costa Rica
Expatriate footballers in Mexico
Expatriate footballers in Guatemala
Salvadoran expatriate sportspeople in Costa Rica
Salvadoran expatriate sportspeople in Mexico
Salvadoran expatriate sportspeople in Guatemala
Association football defenders
2021 CONCACAF Gold Cup players